Pseudohemihyalea syracosia is a moth of the family Erebidae first described by Herbert Druce in 1889. It was formerly believed to be a synonym of Pseudohemihyalea ambigua. It is found from Michoacán, Mexico to Honduras.

The length of the forewings is about 20 mm. Adults are on wing from May to September.

The larvae probably feed on Pinus species.

External links
  (2009): Revision of the "Aemilia" ambigua (Strecker) species-group (Noctuidae, Arctiinae). ZooKeys 9: 63-78.  PDF fulltext

syracosia
Moths described in 1889